Research and Humanities in Medical Education  (RHiME)is an open-access peer-reviewed academic journal published by the Medical Humanities Group at the University College of Medical Sciences and Guru Teg Bahadur Hospital, Delhi. It covers the role of the humanities in medical education, including the history of medicine, narrative medicine, graphic medicine, disability studies, and arts-based interventions, such as healing by means of Theatre of the Oppressed, poetry, literature, film, music and art. The journal was established in 2014. , the editor-in-chief is Upreet Dhaliwal.

References

External links
 

Medical humanities
Theatre of the Oppressed
Publications established in 2014
English-language journals
General medical journals
2014 establishments in Delhi